The Soul of America: The Battle for Our Better Angels is a 2018 book by Jon Meacham, published by Random House.

The Soul of America debuted at number one on The New York Times' list of best selling nonfiction books.

Content

This book is a history of America from colonial days to those of Donald Trump. It traces the ups and downs of public issues including race, civil rights, immigration, women's suffrage and rights and internal and external threats to the democratic process, including the KKK and Communism in seven chapters plus an introduction and conclusion. It ends with more than 100 pages of notes, references and an index.

Documentary
On October 14, 2020, it was announced that a documentary based on the book will premiere on October 27, 2020 on HBO and HBO Max.

See also
The New York Times Non-Fiction Best Sellers of 2018

References

External links
The Soul of America (2018), C-SPAN
Jon Meacham Interview "The Soul of America". Part 1. HBO / Kunhardt Film Foundation (KFF) Documentary. YouTube. 
Jon Meacham Interview "The Soul of America". Part 2. HBO / Kunhardt Film Foundation (KFF) Documentary. YouTube.

2018 non-fiction books
Random House books